In geometry, a striking feature of projective planes is the symmetry of the roles played by points and lines in the definitions and theorems, and (plane) duality is the formalization of this concept. There are two approaches to the subject of duality, one through language and the other a more functional approach through special mappings. These are completely equivalent and either treatment has as its starting point the axiomatic version of the geometries under consideration. In the functional approach there is a map between related geometries that is called a duality. Such a map can be constructed in many ways. The concept of plane duality readily extends to space duality and beyond that to duality in any finite-dimensional projective geometry.

Principle of duality 
A projective plane  may be defined axiomatically as an incidence structure, in terms of a set  of points, a set  of lines, and an incidence relation  that determines which points lie on which lines. These sets can be used to define a plane dual structure.

Interchange the role of "points" and "lines" in  

to obtain the dual structure
,

The projective planes  for any field (or, more generally, for every division ring (skewfield) isomorphic to its dual)  are self-dual. In particular, Desarguesian planes of finite order are always self-dual. However, there are non-Desarguesian planes which are not self-dual, such as the Hall planes and some that are, such as the Hughes planes.

In a projective plane a statement involving points, lines and incidence between them that is obtained from another such statement by interchanging the words "point" and "line" and making whatever grammatical adjustments that are necessary, is called the plane dual statement of the first. The plane dual statement of "Two points are on a unique line" is "Two lines meet at a unique point". Forming the plane dual of a statement is known as dualizing the statement.

If a statement is true in a projective plane , then the plane dual of that statement must be true in the dual plane . This follows since dualizing each statement in the proof "in " gives a corresponding statement of the proof "in ".

The above concepts can be generalized to talk about space duality, where the terms "points" and "planes" are interchanged (and lines remain lines). This leads to the principle of space duality.

These principles provide a good reason for preferring to use a "symmetric" term for the incidence relation. Thus instead of saying "a point lies on a line" one should say "a point is incident with a line" since dualizing the latter only involves interchanging point and line ("a line is incident with a point").

The validity of the principle of plane duality follows from the axiomatic definition of a projective plane. The three axioms of this definition can be written so that they are self-dual statements implying that the dual of a projective plane is also a projective plane. The dual of a true statement in a projective plane is therefore a true statement in the dual projective plane and the implication is that for self-dual planes, the dual of a true statement in that plane is also a true statement in that plane.

Dual theorems
As the real projective plane, is self-dual there are a number of pairs of well known results that are duals of each other. Some of these are:

 Desargues' theorem ⇔ Converse of Desargues' theorem
 Pascal's theorem ⇔ Brianchon's theorem
 Menelaus' theorem ⇔ Ceva's theorem

Dual configurations

Not only statements, but also systems of points and lines can be dualized.

The dual of an  configuration, is an  configuration. Thus, the dual of a quadrangle, a (43, 62) configuration of four points and six lines, is a quadrilateral, a (62, 43) configuration of six points and four lines.

The set of all points on a line, called a projective range has as its dual a pencil of lines, the set of all lines on a point.

Duality as a mapping

Plane dualities

That is, a plane duality  will map points to lines and lines to points ( and ) in such a way that if a point  is on a line  (denoted by ) then . A plane duality which is an isomorphism is called a correlation. The existence of a correlation means that the projective plane  is self-dual.

The projective plane  in this definition need not be a Desarguesian plane. However, if it is, that is,  with  a division ring (skewfield), then a duality, as defined below for general projective spaces, gives a plane duality on  that satisfies the above definition.

In general projective spaces

Consequently, a duality interchanges objects of dimension  with objects of dimension  ( = codimension ). That is, in a projective space of dimension , the points (dimension 0) correspond to hyperplanes (codimension 1), the lines joining two points (dimension 1) correspond to the intersection of two hyperplanes (codimension 2), and so on.

Classification of dualities

The dual  of a finite-dimensional (right) vector space  over a skewfield  can be regarded as a (right) vector space of the same dimension over the opposite skewfield .

In the classical literature,  would be called a reciprocity in general, and if  it would be called a correlation (and  would necessarily be a field). Some authors suppress the role of the natural isomorphism and call  a duality. When this is done, a duality may be thought of as a collineation between a pair of specially related projective spaces and called a reciprocity. If this collineation is a projectivity then it is called a correlation.

Define the form  by:
 
 is a nondegenerate sesquilinear form with companion antiautomorphism .

Homogeneous coordinate formulation

Homogeneous coordinates may be used to give an algebraic description of dualities. To simplify this discussion we shall assume that  is a field, but everything can be done in the same way when  is a skewfield as long as attention is paid to the fact that multiplication need not be a commutative operation.

A nonzero vector  in  also determines an  - geometric dimensional subspace (hyperplane) , by 
.
They are referred to as point coordinates or hyperplane coordinates respectively (in the important two-dimensional case, hyperplane coordinates are called line coordinates). Some authors distinguish how a vector is to be interpreted by writing hyperplane coordinates as horizontal (row) vectors while point coordinates are written as vertical (column) vectors. Thus, if  is a column vector we would have  while . In terms of the usual dot product, . Since  is a field, the dot product is symmetrical, meaning .

A fundamental example
This extends to a reciprocity between the line generated by two points and the intersection of two such hyperplanes, and so forth.

Specifically, in the projective plane, with  a field, we have the correlation given by: points in homogeneous coordinates  lines with equations . In a projective space, a correlation is given by: points in homogeneous coordinates  planes with equations .

The associated sesquilinear form for this correlation is:
 ,
where the companion antiautomorphism . This is therefore a bilinear form (note that  must be a field). This can be written in matrix form (with respect to the standard basis) as:
 ,

The correlation is given by:

Geometric interpretation in the real projective plane

This correlation in the case of  can be described geometrically using the model of the real projective plane which is a "unit sphere with antipodes identified", or equivalently, the model of lines and planes through the origin of the vector space . Associate to any line through the origin the unique plane through the origin which is perpendicular (orthogonal) to the line. When, in the model, these lines are considered to be the points and the planes the lines of the projective plane , this association becomes a correlation (actually a polarity) of the projective plane. The sphere model is obtained by intersecting the lines and planes through the origin with a unit sphere centered at the origin. The lines meet the sphere in antipodal points which must then be identified to obtain a point of the projective plane, and the planes meet the sphere in great circles which are thus the lines of the projective plane.

That this association "preserves" incidence is most easily seen from the lines and planes model. A point incident with a line in the projective plane corresponds to a line through the origin lying in a plane through the origin in the model. Applying the association, the plane becomes a line through the origin perpendicular to the plane it is associated with. This image line is perpendicular to every line of the plane which passes through the origin, in particular the original line (point of the projective plane). All lines that are perpendicular to the original line at the origin lie in the unique plane which is orthogonal to the original line, that is, the image plane under the association. Thus, the image line lies in the image plane and the association preserves incidence.

Matrix form

As in the above example, matrices can be used to represent dualities.

The notation  means that the antiautomorphism  is applied to each coordinate of the vector .

Now define the duality in terms of point coordinates by:

Polarity

A duality that is an involution (has order two) is called a polarity. It is necessary to distinguish between polarities of general projective spaces and those that arise from the slightly more general definition of plane duality. It is also possible to give more precise statements in the case of a finite geometry, so we shall emphasize the results in finite projective planes.

Polarities of general projective spaces
It is also common to bypass mentioning the dual space and write, in terms of the associated sesquilinear form:
 

A sesquilinear form  is reflexive if  implies .

A duality is a polarity if and only if the (nondegenerate) sesquilinear form defining it is reflexive.

Polarities have been classified, a result of  that has been reproven several times. If  is the sesquilinear form associated with a polarity then either:
In this case, the polarity is called orthogonal (or ordinary).
The polarity is called a null polarity (or a symplectic polarity) and can only exist when the projective dimension  is odd.
Such a polarity is called a unitary polarity (or a Hermitian polarity).

Similarly, a hyperplane  is an absolute hyperplane (self-conjugate hyperplane) if . Expressed in other terms, a point  is an absolute point of polarity  with associated sesquilinear form  if  and if  is written in terms of matrix , .

The set of absolute points of each type of polarity can be described. We again restrict the discussion to the case that  is a field.
 If  is a field whose characteristic is not two, the set of absolute points of an orthogonal polarity form a nonsingular quadric (if  is infinite, this might be empty). If the characteristic is two, the absolute points of a pseudo polarity form a hyperplane.
 All the points of the space  are absolute points of a null polarity.
 The absolute points of a Hermitian polarity form a Hermitian variety, which may be empty if  is infinite.

When composed with itself, the correlation  (in any dimension) produces the identity function, so it is a polarity. The set of absolute points of this polarity would be the points whose homogeneous coordinates satisfy the equation:
.
Which points are in this point set depends on the field . If  then the set is empty, there are no absolute points (and no absolute hyperplanes). On the other hand, if  the set of absolute points form a nondegenerate quadric (a conic in two-dimensional space). If  is a finite field of odd characteristic the absolute points also form a quadric, but if the characteristic is even the absolute points form a hyperplane (this is an example of a pseudo polarity).

Under any duality, the point  is called the pole of the hyperplane , and this hyperplane is called the polar of the point . Using this terminology, the absolute points of a polarity are the points that are incident with their polars and the absolute hyperplanes are the hyperplanes that are incident with their poles.

Polarities in finite projective planes

By Wedderburn's theorem every finite skewfield is a field and an automorphism of order two (other than the identity) can only exist in a finite field whose order is a square. These facts help to simplify the general situation for finite Desarguesian planes. We have:

In the orthogonal case, the absolute points lie on a conic if  is odd or form a line if . The unitary case can only occur if  is a square; the absolute points and absolute lines form a unital.

In the general projective plane case where duality means plane duality, the definitions of polarity, absolute elements, pole and polar remain the same.

Let  denote a projective plane of order . Counting arguments can establish that for a polarity  of :

The number of non-absolute points (lines) incident with a non-absolute line (point) is even.

Furthermore,

The polarity  has at least  absolute points and if  is not a square, exactly  absolute points. If  has exactly  absolute points then;
 if  is odd, the absolute points form an oval whose tangents are the absolute lines; or
 if  is even, the absolute points are collinear on a non-absolute line.

An upper bound on the number of absolute points in the case that  is a square was given by Seib and a purely combinatorial argument can establish:

A polarity  in a projective plane of square order  has at most  absolute points.

Poles and polars

Reciprocation in the Euclidean plane

A method that can be used to construct a polarity of the real projective plane has, as its starting point, a construction of a partial duality in the Euclidean plane.

In the Euclidean plane, fix a circle  with center  and radius . For each point  other than  define an image point  so that . The line  through  which is perpendicular to the line  is called the polar of the point  with respect to circle .

Let  be a line not passing through .

In order to turn this process into a correlation, the Euclidean plane (which is not a projective plane) needs to be expanded to the extended euclidean plane by adding a line at infinity and points at infinity which lie on this line. The pole of the -axis is the point of infinity of the vertical lines and the pole of the -axis is the point of infinity of the horizontal lines.

The construction of a correlation based on inversion in a circle given above can be generalized by using inversion in a conic section (in the extended real plane). The correlations constructed in this manner are of order two, that is, polarities.

Algebraic formulation

We shall describe this polarity algebraically by following the above construction in the case that  is the unit circle (i.e.) centered at the origin.

An affine point , other than the origin, with Cartesian coordinates  has as its inverse in the unit circle the point  with coordinates,

The line passing through  that is perpendicular to the line  has equation .

Switching to homogeneous coordinates using the embedding , the extension to the real projective plane is obtained by permitting the last coordinate to be 0. Recalling that point coordinates are written as column vectors and line coordinates as row vectors, we may express this polarity by:

such that

Or, using the alternate notation, . The matrix of the associated sesquilinear form (with respect to the standard basis) is:

The absolute points of this polarity are given by the solutions of:

where T. Note that restricted to the Euclidean plane (that is, set ) this is just the unit circle, the circle of inversion.

Synthetic approach

The theory of poles and polars of a conic in a projective plane can be developed without the use of coordinates and other metric concepts.

Two distinct secant lines to the conic, say  and  determine four points on the conic that form a quadrangle. The point  is a vertex of the diagonal triangle of this quadrangle.

The theory of projective harmonic conjugates of points on a line can also be used to define this relationship. Using the same notation as above;

Properties

There are several properties that polarities in a projective plane have.

Absolute points are called self-conjugate in keeping with this definition since they are incident with their own polars. Conjugate lines are defined dually.

The line joining two self-conjugate points cannot be a self-conjugate line.

A line cannot contain more than two self-conjugate points.

A polarity induces an involution of conjugate points on any line that is not self-conjugate.

A triangle in which each vertex is the pole of the opposite side is called a self-polar triangle.

A correlation that maps the three vertices of a triangle to their opposite sides respectively is a polarity and this triangle is self-polar with respect to this polarity.

History
The principle of duality is due to Joseph Diaz Gergonne (1771−1859) a champion of the then emerging field of Analytic geometry and founder and editor of the first journal devoted entirely to mathematics, Annales de mathématiques pures et appliquées. Gergonne and Charles Julien Brianchon (1785−1864) developed the concept of plane duality. Gergonne coined the terms "duality" and "polar" (but "pole" is due to F.-J. Servois) and adopted the style of writing dual statements side by side in his journal.

Jean-Victor Poncelet (1788−1867) author of the first text on projective geometry, Traité des propriétés projectives des figures, was a synthetic geometer who systematically developed the theory of poles and polars with respect to a conic. Poncelet maintained that the principle of duality was a consequence of the theory of poles and polars.

Julius Plücker (1801−1868) is credited with extending the concept of duality to three and higher dimensional projective spaces.

Poncelet and Gergonne started out as earnest but friendly rivals presenting their different points of view and techniques in papers appearing in Annales de Gergonne. Antagonism grew over the issue of priority in claiming the principle of duality as their own. A young Plücker was caught up in this feud when a paper he had submitted to Gergonne was so heavily edited by the time it was published that Poncelet was misled into believing that Plücker had plagiarized him. The vitriolic attack by Poncelet was countered by Plücker with the support of Gergonne and ultimately the onus was placed on Gergonne. Of this feud, Pierre Samuel has quipped that since both men were in the French army and Poncelet was a general while Gergonne a mere captain, Poncelet's view prevailed, at least among their French contemporaries.

See also
 Dual curve

Notes

References

Further reading

 F. Bachmann, 1959. Aufbau der Geometrie aus dem Spiegelungsbegriff, Springer, Berlin.
 
 
 
 
 Coxeter, H. S. M., 1995. The Real Projective Plane, 3rd ed. Springer Verlag.
 Coxeter, H. S. M., 2003. Projective Geometry, 2nd ed. Springer Verlag. .
 
 
 Greenberg, M. J., 2007. Euclidean and non-Euclidean geometries, 4th ed. Freeman.
 
 Hartshorne, Robin, 2000. Geometry: Euclid and Beyond. Springer.
 Hilbert, D. and Cohn-Vossen, S., 1999. Geometry and the imagination, 2nd ed. Chelsea.

External links

Projective geometry
Projective geometry